The Sir Robert Menzies Lecture is an annual lecture delivered in Melbourne, by a prominent politician, academic or other noteworthy individual, about various aspects of modern liberalism. The lectures have been held annually since 1978, and are named in honour of Sir Robert Menzies, Australia's longest-serving prime minister.

History
The lecture was first proposed by the Monash University Liberal Club in 1976, when the president of the club was Michael Kroger, and it was held in its early years at the Clayton campus of the university. The inaugural speaker was the then Prime Minister Malcolm Fraser. The 1981 appearance of Margaret Thatcher drew strong protests from students; at the same time, Thatcher's lecture was one of the best-remembered of the series - receiving coverage on the front page of The Times in London as Thatcher rebuked former Tory prime minister Edward Heath and his call for a consensus government.  

After the first lecture, the Sir Robert Menzies Lecture Trust was established to ensure the year-to-year running of the finances and organisation of the lecture. The inaugural chairman of the Trust was Dr Alan Gregory AM (1978 to 2010).  Since 2010, Ron Wilson has been chairman of the Trust.

The lecture is now held each year at various locations in Melbourne, including Parliament House, Melbourne. The Monash University Liberal Club continues to be involved with the Trust in the operation of the lecture.

John Howard is the only person to have given the lecture on two occasions (in 1980 when he was the Federal Treasurer, and again in 1996 after he had become Prime Minister).

Patrons
Sir Robert Menzies willingly agreed to lend his name to the Trust, but died before the inaugural lecture was delivered. The founding patron of the lecture was Sir Robert's widow, Dame Pattie Menzies, and the current patron is their daughter Mrs Heather Henderson AM.

Lecturers

References

External links
 Menzies Lecture Homepage
 1981 Lecture: Margaret Thatcher

Politics of Australia
1978 establishments in Australia
Recurring events established in 1978
Annual events in Australia